Philip Rapp (March 26, 1907 – January 23, 1996) was a film and television director and screenwriter. He wrote for Eddie Cantor and, for a brief period, wrote film scripts for Danny Kaye. Rapp is perhaps best known as the creator of Baby Snooks and The Bickersons. He died on January 23, 1996, in Beverly Hills, California.

Rapp was a writer, director, and producer, and he directed a popular long-running radio series called The Batting Bickersons. He also introduced the Baby Snooks character for Fanny Brice of the Ziegfeld Follies.

Topper (1953) is also directed by Rapp.

Selected filmography

Director
 Star Time (1950–1951)
 Topper (1 episode, 1954)
 The Adventures of Hiram Holliday (8 episodes, 1956–1959)

Producer
 The Adventures of Hiram Holliday (9 episodes, 1956–1959)

Writer
 Strike Me Pink (1936)
 Start Cheering (1938)
 Wonder Man (1945)
 Ziegfeld Follies (1946)
 The Inspector General (1949)
 Topper (19 episodes, 1954–1955)
 The Adventures of Hiram Holliday (8 episodes, 1956–1959)
 Wild and Wonderful (1964)
 My Favorite Martian (1 episode, 1965)

References

External links
 
 

1907 births
1996 deaths
American male screenwriters
American television directors
American television producers
Place of birth unknown
20th-century American businesspeople
20th-century American male writers
20th-century American screenwriters